Sherif is a given name and surname.

Sherif may also refer to:
Sherif (choreographer) (born 1981), Indian choreographer

See also

Sharif, title of descendents of Muhammad
Sharif (disambiguation)
Sheriff, government official
Sheriff (disambiguation)